The Diocese of Gippsland is a diocese of the Anglican Church of Australia, founded in 1902. It is situated in the Gippsland region of the state of Victoria, Australia and covers most of the eastern part of the state. The diocesan cathedral is St Paul's Cathedral, Sale. The current Bishop of Gippsland, installed on 18 August 2018, is Richard Treloar.

History 
The Diocese of Gippsland was created after a movement to divide the Diocese of Melbourne, the oldest Anglican diocese in Victoria, established in 1847. Talk began of this as early as 1885 and in 1900 a bill was passed to create the Diocese of Sandhurst-Beechworth. Debate continued after this decision and eventually led to another bill in 1901, with which three new dioceses were created. Along with Ballarat and Wangaratta, the Diocese of Gippsland came into existence in the following year. The bishops of each of these dioceses were elected by a body made up of the Bishop of Melbourne, four members of the Melbourne Bishopric Election Board, four clergy from the area in question and four laity. Arthur Pain was chosen to be the first to preside over the Diocese of Gippsland. He was consecrated as a bishop at St Andrew's Cathedral in Sydney, having previously ministered at St John's Darlinghurst in Sydney. He was then installed as Bishop of Gippsland in the Cathedral of St Paul in Gippsland on 10 July 1902.

Bishops

Facilities
The cathedral church of the diocese is the Cathedral Church of St Paul, Sale. The diocese also has two affiliated schools, Gippsland Grammar School and St Paul's Anglican Grammar School, Warragul.

References

Sources
 H.W. Nunn: A Short History of the Church of England in Victoria 1847-1947 (1947)
Albert E. Clarke: The Church of  our Fathers
 I. T. Maddern: Light and Life  A  history of the Anglican Church in Gippsland, Diocese of Gippsland website

External links
 

Gippsland
Christian organizations established in 1902
1902 establishments in Australia
Gippsland